Huntsman Cancer Institute (HCI) is an NCI-designated cancer research facility and hospital located on the campus of the University of Utah in Salt Lake City, Utah. It is the only National Cancer Institute-designated Comprehensive Cancer Center in the Intermountain West.

Overview
Huntsman Cancer Institute was founded with a pledge of $100 million of personal wealth from Jon Huntsman Sr., a philanthropist and businessman. To date, Huntsman has donated more than $250 million of his own money since Huntsman Cancer Institute was established. Mary Beckerle is HCI's chief executive officer and director.

In November 2013, Huntsman donated an additional $50 million for the construction of a new research building dedicated to researching children's cancer and cancers that run in families. The Primary Children's and Families' Research Center opened in 2017.

In 2015, the National Cancer Institute awarded HCI Comprehensive Cancer Center status.

Research
Scientists at the institute aim to understand cancer at a molecular and genetic level and strive to find new and more effective ways to treat this disease. A treatment approach based on genetic knowledge allows for more targeted, individualized cancer therapies.

Research programs
The center's research is supported by a Cancer Center Support Grant from the National Cancer Institute, which subsidizes cancer research performed by more than 130 members of the Cancer Center.

Sponsored Content controversy
In 2017, the Sinclair Broadcasting Group was fined 13.3 million US-$ by the FCC for not properly designating paid advertising content by the Huntsman Cancer Institute as such. The advertisements, either in the form of 60- or 90-second shorts or half-hour standalone programs, were shown over 1700 times in SBG-affiliated broadcasts. In a statement, Sinclair denounced the fine, which at that point was the largest ever imposed by the FCC, as "unreasonable".

References

External links
 Huntsman Cancer Institute

Hospital buildings completed in 1999
Cancer hospitals
Medical research institutes in the United States
Medical and health organizations based in Utah
Teaching hospitals in Utah
University of Utah
1999 establishments in Utah
NCI-designated cancer centers